Cottus gratzianowi is a species of freshwater ray-finned fish belonging to the family Cottidae, the typical sculpins. It is endemic to Russia. It inhabits the Ukhtomitsa River in the Onega River drainage.

References

Fish of Russia
Cottus (fish)
Fish described in 2015